Diez segundos (Ten Seconds) is a 1949 Argentine film directed by Alejandro Wehner, produced by Emelco studios. The film is a boxing drama starring Ricardo Duggan, María Esther Buschiazzo, Patricia Castell, Carlos D'Agostino (voice), Delfy de Ortega,  María Rosa Gallo, Oscar Valicelli and Oscar Villa. It premiered on November 23, 1949 in Buenos Aires. The film was distributed by Interamericana. Castell and Rosa Gallo would later star alongside each other in several films and television series over several decades including Perla Negra and Zíngara (1996).

Plot

The film is loosely based on Horacio Estol's 1946 Vida y combates de Luis Angel Firpo, a biography of the Argentine boxer Luis Ángel Firpo who came close to beating Jack Dempsey in 1923.

In the film, a humble lad starts to learn to box to defend himself, then goes on to become a professional boxer. He is trained heavily by Oscar Villa. Duggan's love interest in the film is played by Patrica Castell.

 Cast 
 María Esther Buschiazzo   
 Patricia Castell   
 Carlos D'Agostino 
 Delfy de Ortega   
 Ricardo Duggan   
 María Rosa Gallo   
 Oscar Valicelli   
Raul del Valle
 Oscar Villa

Reception

The book which the film was based on, Estol's Vida y combates de Luis Angel Firpo (1946) was received quite poorly and Wehner was inexperienced as a director, resulting in a disappointing film.

A critic of the newspaper Noticias Gráficas said (in English): "They have used a narrative method that disappoints the viewer" and compared it to the delirium a boxer experiences when being knocked out. Diario Critica'' newspaper said (in English) "Some secrets of the technique get some interesting effects, but it reveals absolute nullity in the management of the interpreter."

The authors of a 2009 analysis of the role of sports in Juan Peron’s government see the film as an example of the government’s pursuit of national advancement and social mobility through sporting achievement. Its MALBA entry describes it as a classic Argentinian B movie and as a faithful, almost anthropological, representation of life in a Buenos Aires neighborhood of the time.

References

External links

 

1949 films
1940s Spanish-language films
Argentine black-and-white films
Argentine boxing films